Corton Cutting is a 0.24 hectare geological Site of Special Scientific Interest in Dorset, England, notified in 1997.

The site is listed in the Geological Conservation Review.

Sources
 English Nature citation sheet for the site (accessed 31 August 2006)

External links
 English Nature website (SSSI information)

Sites of Special Scientific Interest in Dorset
Sites of Special Scientific Interest notified in 1997
Geology of Dorset
Railway cuttings in the United Kingdom